National Children's Task Force (NCTF) is a national children's organization which has been working in all 64 districts in Bangladesh through the Integrated Development Approach since 2003. The NCTF was established primarily to monitor the implementation of the National Plan of Action, adopted in 2002–2006, against sexual abuse and exploitation of children including trafficking. It has expanded its role to monitor other child rights issues, and raise concerns to hold duty bearers accountable as well as continue to create space for participation of children in decision making.

NCTF works for child rights and child protection. It has reached all the districts of Bangladesh and has a district committee in all the districts. All this committees are directed by the children. Its aim is to establish child rights in Bangladesh.

Children from 12 years to 18 years are eligible to be members of NCTF.  NCTF has ensured equal number of boys and girls and representation from all groups of children irrespective of their backgrounds and socio-economic context. At present, NCTF is the only nationwide children's organization consisting of approximately 38,000+ members.

NCTF have been involved in initiating child-led advocacy both at local and national levels. At district levels, NCTF members have been organizing public hearings and dialogue session with duty bearers to discuss child rights issues and instill the mechanism for accountability. NCTF has initiated evidence-based advocacy at national level to influence policies through Child Parliament.

Over the years, NCTF have gained remarkable support from the government including the Bangladesh Shishu Academy (BSA), which provides office space and support for housing NCTF secretariat in all 64 districts. Also Save the Children and Plan International Bangladesh give technical support to NCTF.  NCTF has 256 trained Child Researchers, 128 trained Child Journalists, and 84 trained Child Facilitators from 64 Districts.

Emergency response 

In addition to the development activities, NCTF partially works for emergency response and recovery.  Disaster management is one of our most important interventions, as we are working in both cyclone-prone and flood-prone districts like Barguna, Sirajganj, Cox's Bazer, Tangail, Gazipur, and Khagrachori, Chittagong.  NCTF's development program and activities are child & youth organization development, issue based capacity building training, and peace through reconciliation in Chittagong.

NCTF members monitor child rights issues across Bangladesh.  The Child Parliament, a national level platform of NCTF, plays an active role in raising the consciousness of duty bearers on child rights issues.

NCTF's program is made up of children from all walks of life and all provinces in Bangladesh, providing a forum to formulate child-friendly policies based on their research. Recently, there have been three major achievements:

 The Ministry of Education banned all forms of corporal punishment in Bangladeshi educational institutions.
 The Chairperson of the Parliamentary Standing Committee on Education proposed to submit a Bill that will include education as a fundamental right in the Constitution of Bangladesh.
 During Child Rights Week, the Prime Minister of Bangladesh declared a stop to the involvement of children in all political demonstrations. These were all achieved as a result of Child Parliament activities.

References

External links 
 http://nctfbd.org/
 http://www.facebook.com/nctfcentral
 http://www.newstoday.com.bd/index.php?option=details&news_id=33558&date=2011-07-19
 http://thedailystar.net/beta2/news/no-excuse-for-border-killings/

Youth organisations based in Bangladesh